The 2016–17 Western Illinois Leathernecks women's basketball represents Western Illinois University. The Leathernecks, are headed by JD Gravina and are members of The Summit League. They finished the season 26–7, 13–3 in Summit League play to finish in first place. They won The Summit League Women's Tournament, defeating IUPUI 77–69 in overtime. They were invited to the NCAA Women's Tournament for the first time since 1995, where they lost to Florida State in the first round.

References 

Western Illinois
Western Illinois Leathernecks women's basketball seasons
Sum
Sum